Elmer Bendiner (February 11, 1916 – September 16, 2001) was an American writer and journalist.

Bendiner was born in Pittsburgh to William Bendiner, a businessman, and Lillian (maiden name Schwartz).  His brother was Robert Bendiner.  Growing up Jewish in an Appalachian environment where the Ku Klux Klan was influential and "Jews, Catholics, and the very few blacks on the outskirts of town ... served as ritualistic enemies" helped shape him. He attended City College of New York from 1932 to 1935, then met Esther Shapiro, an editorial assistant, while he was working for the Brooklyn Daily Eagle; they were married in 1941, shortly before the U.S. entered World War II. During the war, Bendiner served as a B-17 Flying Fortress navigator, receiving the Distinguished Flying Cross, the Air Medal with three oak leaf clusters, and the Purple Heart.

After the war, he worked for Esquire, then for a series of medical publications, and wrote a number of books. Among his better-known works are The Rise and Fall of Paradise (a history of al-Andalus), A Time for Angels: A Tragicomic History of the League of Nations, The Bowery Man, The Virgin Diplomats, Biographical Dictionary of Medicine (cowritten with his daughter Jessica), and The Fall of Fortresses.

References

Sources
New York Times death notice

1916 births
2001 deaths
20th-century American historians
American military writers
Jewish American historians
American male non-fiction writers
Recipients of the Air Medal
Recipients of the Distinguished Flying Cross (United States)
20th-century American journalists
American male journalists
United States Army Air Forces personnel of World War II
United States Army Air Forces officers
20th-century American male writers
20th-century American Jews